After the Battle was a military history magazine published  quarterly in the United Kingdom by Battle of Britain International Limited between 1973 and 2021.

History and profile
After the Battle was first published in 1973, and appears on the 15th of February, May, August and November each year. The editor-in-chief since 1973 is Winston Ramsey, assisted by his co-author Gail Parker Ramsey.

The magazine deals with World War II in a "then and now format". Articles are illustrated by historical photographs matched with a modern-day photograph of the identical scene to show how much (or how little) things have changed. Most issues feature a major article on a specific subject, with several smaller articles. All areas of the world are written about.

There are also occasional features on related subjects such as war films, vehicle preservation, war memorials.

Pen and Sword Books have taken over the title, but have not produced new issues since No. 195, labelled the final issue.

References

External links
 

Quarterly magazines published in the United Kingdom
History magazines published in the United Kingdom
Magazines established in 1973
Military magazines published in the United Kingdom
1973 establishments in the United Kingdom